Kevin Krawietz and Maximilian Marterer were the defending champions but only Marterer chose to defend his title, partnering Nils Langer. Langer and Marterer withdrew in the first round.

Luca Margaroli and Mohamed Safwat won the title after defeating Pedro Martínez and Oriol Roca Batalla 6–4, 6–4 in the final.

Seeds

Draw

References
 Main Draw

Morocco Tennis Tour - Meknes - Doubles
2016 Morocco Tennis Tour
Morocco Tennis Tour – Meknes